Marvin Anthony Michael McCoy (born 2 October 1988) is a semi-professional footballer who plays as a defender for Cray Wanderers. Born in England, he has represented Antigua and Barbuda internationally.

Club career

Early career
Born in Walthamstow, London, McCoy was part of the youth teams of Leyton, Arsenal and Watford before becoming a trainee with the latter. He was released by Watford in the summer of 2007 having not been given a professional contract, and joined League Two club Hereford United on 31 August on a one-month contract. In December 2007, he made his debut for Isthmian League Premier Division club Harrow Borough in a 1–0 defeat to Staines Town in the Middlesex Senior Cup, which proved to be his only appearance for the club. He returned to Isthmian League Premier Division Leyton in January 2008, before signing for Wealdstone, of the same division, on 6 August 2008.

Wealdstone
McCoy played impressively for Wealdstone in the 2008–09 season, in which he made 34 appearances, and was rewarded with a new contract in June 2009. He was named the club's Player of the Year, being awarded the Jock Law trophy, after being chosen by the club's supporters for his performances in 2009–10. He was also named the Players' Player of the Year, for a season in which he made 50 appearances and scored one goal. During this time he also worked in CCTV management in the Kings Cross area of London.

Wycombe Wanderers

McCoy entered the professional game after signing for Wycombe Wanderers of League Two on 27 July 2010 on a one-year contract for an undisclosed fee, after impressing on trial. He made his debut for Wycombe on 10 August 2010 in their League Cup first round 2–1 defeat to Millwall at Adams Park. He did not make his Football League debut until 3 January 2011 in a 1–0 home win over Gillingham, before making the right back position his own ahead of Danny Foster. McCoy signed a new contract with Wycombe in March 2011, tying him to the club until the summer of 2013. He helped Wycombe earn promotion to League One after finishing third in League Two in 2010–11, appearing 25 times.

McCoy made 32 appearances for Wycombe in 2011–12, which culminated in the club being relegated after one year in League One. He sustained ankle ligament damage during Wycombe's 1–0 away defeat to Watford in the League Cup on 11 August 2012, and only returned to the team four months later in a 2–0 loss away to Yeovil Town in the Football League Trophy on 4 December. He signed a new one-year contract in July 2013, after making 11 appearances in 2012–13.

McCoy was a key figure for Wycombe in 2013–14, in which they fought against relegation from League Two, and he finished the campaign with 40 appearances. However, he was released by Wycombe on 15 May 2014, after four years at the club.

York City
He signed for League Two club York City on 9 June 2014 on a two-year contract. He made his debut in York's 1–1 away draw with Tranmere Rovers in the opening match of 2014–15 on 9 August 2014. On 22 January 2016, McCoy left York by mutual consent.

Ebbsfleet United
McCoy signed for National League South club Ebbsfleet United on 12 August 2016. He started in Ebbsfleet's 2–1 win over Chelmsford City in the 2017 National League South play-off Final, which saw the club promoted to the National League. He was released by Ebbsfleet at the end of 2017–18.

Aldershot Town
McCoy signed for National League club Aldershot Town on 2 July 2018 on a contract of undisclosed length. In April 2019, he was released by the club.

Dulwich Hamlet
He signed for Dulwich Hamlet on 7 September 2019.

Romford
McCoy joined Romford for the 2020-21 season.

International career
McCoy was called up to make his debut for the Antigua and Barbuda national team in late 2010.

Career statistics

Club

International

Honours
Wycombe Wanderers
Football League Two third-place promotion: 2010–11

Ebbsfleet United
National League South play-offs: 2017

Individual
Wealdstone Player of the Year: 2009–10

References

External links

Profile at the Aldershot Town F.C. website

1988 births
Living people
Footballers from Walthamstow
Antigua and Barbuda footballers
Antigua and Barbuda international footballers
English footballers
Association football defenders
Leyton F.C. players
Arsenal F.C. players
Watford F.C. players
Hereford United F.C. players
Harrow Borough F.C. players
Wealdstone F.C. players
Wycombe Wanderers F.C. players
York City F.C. players
Ebbsfleet United F.C. players
Aldershot Town F.C. players
Dulwich Hamlet F.C. players
Romford F.C. players
Isthmian League players
English Football League players
National League (English football) players
Black British sportspeople
English sportspeople of Antigua and Barbuda descent